"Apologize" is a 1967 song written by Jimmy Griffin and Michael Z. Gordon which won a BMI Award in 1968. The song was first recorded as a single by Brian Hyland in 1967, but hit the charts in the version by Ed Ames in June 1968, reaching No.9 on the Metro Markets Juke Box chart.

References

1967 songs
Ed Ames songs
Songs written by Jimmy Griffin
Songs written by Michael Z. Gordon